The 2018–19 Baylor Bears basketball team represented Baylor University in the 2018–19 NCAA Division I men's basketball season. This was head coach Scott Drew's 16th season at Baylor. The Bears competed in the Big 12 Conference and played their home games at the Ferrell Center in Waco, TX. They finished the season 20-14, 10-8 to finish in 4th place. They lost in the quarterfinals of the Big 12 tournament to Iowa State. They received a at-large bid to the NCAA Tournament where they defeated Syracuse in the first round before losing in the second round to Gonzaga.

Previous season
The Bears finished the 2017–18 season 19–15 overall and 8–10 in Big 12 play, finishing in a four-way tie for sixth place. As the No. 6 seed in the Big 12 tournament, they were defeated by West Virginia in the quarterfinals. They were one of the last four teams not selected for the NCAA tournament and as a result earned a no. 1 seed in the National Invitation Tournament, where they defeated Wagner in the first round before losing to Mississippi State in the second round.

Offseason

Departures

Incoming transfers

2018 recruiting class

2019 recruiting class

Roster

Schedule and results

|-
!colspan=9 style=|Regular season

|-
!colspan=9 style=| Big 12 tournament

|-
!colspan=9 style=| NCAA tournament

References

Baylor
Baylor Bears men's basketball seasons
Baylor